Aguinaldo is a Portuguese given name and a Filipino surname. Notable people with this name include:

Given names 
Aguinaldo Braga (born 1974), Brazilian-Macedonian footballer
Aguinaldo Filho, Brazilian radio personality
Aguinaldo Fonseca (1922-2014), Cape Verdean poet
Aguinaldo Jaime (born 1954), Angolan economist
Aguinaldo (footballer) (born 1989), Angolan-Portuguese footballer
Aguinaldo Ribeiro (born 1969), Brazilian politician
Aguinaldo Roberto Gallon (born 1958), Brazilian footballer
Aguinaldo Silva (born 1943), Brazilian writer
Aguinaldo Tati (born 1990), Angolan handball player

Surnames 
Aguinaldo family, a political family in the Philippines
Ameurfina Aguinaldo Melencio (1922–2020), Filipina lawyer
Baldomero Aguinaldo (1869–1915), leader of the Philippine Revolution
Bernadette Sembrano-Aguinaldo (born 1976), Filipina reporter
Cesar Enrique Aguinaldo Virata (born 1930), Filipino former statesman and businessman
Críspulo Aguinaldo (1863–1897), Filipino lieutenant general
Emilio Aguinaldo (1869-1964), former president of the Philippines
Francis Gerald Aguinaldo Abaya (born 1975), Filipino politician
Hilaria Aguinaldo (1877–1921), first wife of Emilio Aguinaldo
Joseph Emilio Aguinaldo Abaya (born 1966), Filipino politician
Reynaldo Aguinaldo (1946-2019), Filipino politician
Amani Aguinaldo (born 1995), Filipino footballer
Rodolfo Aguinaldo (born 1946), Filipino politician and former governor of Cagayan
Sandra Aguinaldo (born 1975), Filipina television news anchor journalist

References 

Given names
Surnames
Portuguese masculine given names
Tagalog-language surnames